Statistics of Belgian First Division in the 1957–58 season.

Overview

It was contested by 16 teams, and Standard Liège won the championship.

League standings

Results

References

Belgian Pro League seasons
1957–58 in Belgian football
Belgian